Southfield High School for the Arts and Technology is a public high school located in Southfield, Michigan. The school was founded in 1951. It serves grades 9-12 for the Southfield Public Schools.

Notable alumni

 Bill Adler (c/o 1969), writer and hip-hop activist.
 Andrew Bowler (c/o 1991), Academy Award nominated writer/director
 Torin Dorn (c/o 1986), football player for North Carolina at cornerback, National Football League Draft, selected by the Los Angeles Raiders in the 4th round
 Blade Icewood, born Darnell Lindsay
 Kathy Kosins, singer and artist 
 Kevin Lee, professional MMA fighter, current UFC Lightweight contender
 Malik McDowell, NFL defensive tackle for the Seattle Seahawks
 Ira Newble (c/o 1993), forward for the National Basketball Association Los Angeles Lakers
 Spencer Overton (c/o 1986), law professor, voting rights expert, and author
 Karriem Riggins, jazz drummer and former member of the Ray Brown Trio
 Bobby Scales, retired baseball player
 Debbie Schlussel (c/o 1986), attorney and political commentator.
 Freddie Scott, former NFL player
 Jay Sebring, born Thomas John Kummer (c/o 1951), celebrity hair stylist and Manson Family murder victim in 1969
 Robert Shiller (c/o 1963), Nobel Prize Winner in Economics in 2013 and New York Times columnist who started his writing career with his high school newspaper.
 Ted Simmons, former professional baseball player and member of the Baseball Hall of Fame. The athletic field (baseball diamond) of Southfield High School is dedicated to Simmons.
 Rick Titsworth aka Rick Worthy (c/o 1985), television actor
 Gabriel Watson (c/o 2002), football player, Michigan DT, NFL Draft, selected by the Arizona Cardinals in the 4th round
 Ross Weaver, former NFL player
 Rose Abdoo (c/o 1980), professional Actress

References

External links

Public high schools in Michigan
Schools in Southfield, Michigan
Educational institutions established in 1951
High schools in Oakland County, Michigan
1951 establishments in Michigan